Arsenyevskiye Vesti is an independent socio-political and human rights weekly newspaper of the Primorsky Krai.

The main theme of the newspaper is the coverage of topical events in the region, violations of the rights of citizens and exposure of high-ranking officials. Editor   Irina Grebnyova (born in 1943).

In October 2009, the European Court of Human Rights granted the application of a newspaper journalist who was found guilty by the state courts of the Russian Federation of publishing an open letter exposing officials in illegal timber deals.

In 2010 the newspaper received Free Media Awards.

References

External links 
 Official site
  

Publications established in 1992
Russian-language newspapers published in Russia
Free Media Awards winners